Gowan is an unincorporated community in Floodwood Township, Saint Louis County, Minnesota, United States.

The community is located five miles southeast of Floodwood at the intersection of U.S. Highway 2 and Saint Louis County Road 86 (Hingeley Road).

The Saint Louis River, McCarty Creek, and Mirbat Creek all flow through the community.

References

 Official State of Minnesota Highway Map - 2011/2012 edition

Unincorporated communities in Minnesota
Unincorporated communities in St. Louis County, Minnesota